The Military Classic of the South is an American college football rivalry game played between The Citadel and the Virginia Military Institute. The first game between the two military schools was in 1920. The game has been played nearly continuously since World War II; since then, only five seasons have seen the game not played.

The 78th and most recent game of the series saw The Citadel defeat VMI 26–22 at Alumni Memorial Field in Lexington, Virginia.

History
The teams first played each other in 1920. The trophy that is currently awarded, the Silver Shako, was introduced in 1976.

The game has been played nearly continuously since World War II, with no matchup in 1956, 2004, and 2008–2010. The Citadel had won the past twelve meetings before VMI's victory in 2019. The Citadel leads the series 42–32–2.  At one point in 1967, the Keydets led the series 18–8–1. The Military Classic is the thirteenth oldest still-played rivalry in the Football Championship Subdivision (FCS) of the NCAA. Both teams were members of the Southern Conference (SoCon) from 1936 until 2003, when VMI left for the Big South Conference and were reunited in the SoCon when VMI returned in 2014.

Other sports
With the return of VMI to the Southern Conference, annual rivalries have been renewed in college baseball, women's soccer, track and field, and cross country.  VMI remained in the SoCon in wrestling, and continued to compete annually with The Citadel in that sport while a full member of the Big South.  

The Bulldogs and Keydets, along with Air Force and Army, participated in the All-Military Classic basketball tournament, which began in 2011 and continued until the final tournament in 2014.

Game results

Other varsity sports

See also
 List of NCAA college football rivalry games

References

College football rivalries in the United States
The Citadel Bulldogs football
VMI Keydets football
Recurring sporting events established in 1920
Military competitions in American football